Robert B. Lessard (born May 18, 1931) is an American former politician in the state of Minnesota. He was born in International Falls, Minnesota and was a cruise company operator. Lessard is also a veteran of the Korean War. He was a Minnesota state senator from District 3 from 1977 to 2002. He has three children.

Nicknamed "The Old Trapper", Lessard ran for Attorney General of Minnesota in the 2018 election as a Republican. It was noted that Lessard was not an attorney, raised hardly any money and had spent decades as a DFLer. Lessard stated that he was running to protect the state's Clean Water, Land and Legacy Amendment, which he said Republicans were determined to repeal. He came third in the primary election with 63,722 votes (21.7%).

References

1931 births
Living people
Minnesota state senators
People from International Falls, Minnesota
Military personnel from Minnesota
American military personnel of the Korean War
21st-century American politicians
Minnesota Democrats
Minnesota Independents
Independence Party of Minnesota politicians